John Jay Senior High School is a public high school on State Route 52 in the town of East Fishkill, New York. The school teaches grades 9 through 12. Students from Van Wyck who have successfully completed the 8th grade continue to the 9th grade at John Jay. The school is a part of the Wappingers Central School District.

History
John Jay was built in 1968 to accommodate the growth of the Wappingers School District. The 1973 graduating class was the first class to have completed four full years at John Jay HS. John Jay's principal is David Kedzielawa.

In 2002, a new biology-chemistry wing was opened for the exclusive use of these laboratory courses. In 2009, a new math wing was opened on the first floor. The school is geographically surrounded by IBM East Fishkill. The presence of IBM in the area has fueled and helped to fund a model example of a high school engineering focus. John Jay offers many classes focused on engineering, with some classes utilizing college-level computer programs and mathematics. Some of the classes are eligible for college credit through the Rochester Institute of Technology.

Academics
In recent years, John Jay's percentage of students going on to two- and four-year colleges has been in the 90s. Often students enrolled in two-year programs subsequently move on to four-year programs following their earning an associate degree. U.S. News & World Report awarded the school a silver medal, giving it a national rank of 1,156 among the best high schools in the US.

Feeder schools

Elementary schools
 Brinckerhoff Elementary School in Fishkill, New York
 Fishkill Elementary School in Fishkill, New York
 Fishkill Plains Elementary School in East Fishkill, New York
 Gayhead Elementary School in East Fishkill, New York

Junior high schools
 Van Wyck Junior High School in East Fishkill, New York

Notable alumni
 Joe Panik, retired MLB player
 Patti Murin, Actress, “Anna” in Frozen (musical)
Jake Keegan,  professional American soccer player

References

Public high schools in Dutchess County, New York